The Liverpool Pals were Pals battalions formed during the First World War as part of the King's (Liverpool) Regiment. They, along with the Manchester Pals, are commemorated at a small memorial in France.

Recruitment
The volunteers were initially sought at The Kings Regiment Liverpool HQ in St Anne Street on 28 August 1914, and were addressed by Lord Derby, who said:I am not going to make you a speech of heroics.  You have given me your answer, and I can telegraph to Lord Kitchener tonight to say that our second battalion is formed.  This should be a Battalion of Pals, a battalion in which friends from the same office will fight shoulder to shoulder for the honour of Britain and the credit of Liverpool.   I don’t attempt to minimise to you the hardships you will suffer, the risks you will run.  I don’t ask you to uphold Liverpool’s honour, it would be an insult to think that you could do anything but that. But I do thank you from the bottom of my heart for coming here tonight and showing what is the spirit of Liverpool, a spirit that ought to spread through every city and every town in the kingdom.   

Businesses had been asked to encourage their staff to enlist, and the volunteers were drawn from city offices and factories.  Although similar events were held elsewhere, recruitment in Liverpool was said to be particularly strong.  The numbers attending were far greater than anticipated, and extra rooms were opened up in order to enlist them.  By November, enough volunteers had come forward to form four battalions. 

Barracks were created on disused sites at Prescot, Hooton, Sefton Park and Knowsley Park before further training on Salisbury Plain.  They left for France in late 1915, and took part in some of the fiercest battles of the war, with heavy loss of life.  Almost 200 of the Liverpool Pals were killed in one day, 1 July 1916, in the Battle of the Somme.   At the end of the war, about 20% of the volunteers had been killed, and a further 50% injured.  

The Liverpool Pals consisted of:
 17th (Service) Battalion – 1st City, formed at Liverpool, 29 August 1914 by Lord Derby
 18th (Service) Battalion – 2nd City, formed at Liverpool, 29 August 1914 by Lord Derby
 19th (Service) Battalion – 3rd City, formed at Liverpool, 29 August 1914 by Lord Derby
 20th (Service) Battalion – 4th City, formed at Liverpool, 16 October 1914 by Lord Derby
 21st (Reserve) Battalion – formed at Knowsley Park, August 1915 from depot companies of 17th and 18th Battalions
 22nd (Reserve) Battalion – formed at Knowsley Park, August 1915 from depot companies of 19th and 20th Battalions

References

Bibliography

External links
 
 
BBC News Online
Liverpool Echo

Pals battalions
Military units and formations in Liverpool
Military units and formations in Lancashire